In 1937 Frank B. Kellogg established for Carleton College the Frank B. Kellogg Foundation for Education in International Relations with a $500,000 endowment.  Kellogg was a trustee of the college at the time.  The endowment initially funded two full-time professors and one half-time professor, and provided scholarships for six students: four at Carleton College and two Carleton students studying abroad.

Frank B. Kellogg Professors of International Relations 
David Bryn-Jones, 1936-1952
Reginald Lang, 1956-57 Visiting Professor of International Relations on the Frank B. Kellogg Foundation.
Roy F. Grow, Frank B. Kellogg professor of international relations, emeritus
Alfred P. Montero, current Frank B. Kellogg professor of political science
Heinrich P. Jordan
James K. Pollock
M. J. Bonn, Visiting Professor

Sources 
Time Magazine, June 14, 1937

1937 establishments in Minnesota
Scholarships in the United States
Educational foundations in the United States
International relations